The canton of Wassigny is a former administrative division in northern France. It was disbanded following the French canton reorganisation which came into effect in March 2015. It consisted of 15 communes, which joined the canton of Guise in 2015. It had 6,612 inhabitants (2012).

The canton comprised the following communes:

Étreux
Grougis
Hannapes
Mennevret
Molain
Oisy
Ribeauville
Saint-Martin-Rivière
Tupigny
La Vallée-Mulâtre
Vaux-Andigny
Vénérolles
Grand-Verly
Petit-Verly
Wassigny

Demographics

See also
Cantons of the Aisne department

References

Former cantons of Aisne
2015 disestablishments in France
States and territories disestablished in 2015